East Bengal Club Reserves and Academy is the overall name for the structure besides the senior team of East Bengal FC. Reserves generally consist of younger players, but at times senior players also play, if recuperating from injury or not getting first team game time. Apart from the I-League 2, the reserve side usually plays in the Calcutta Football League.

East Bengal Academy are the under-21, under-17, under-15 and under-13 teams of East Bengal. The under-21 team is generally referred to as the primary youth team as it is the last stage of progression for the promotion of youth players into the reserve or first team.
The youth teams participate in the Elite league of various age groups. The East Bengal Academy was re-instated on 20 June 2016 with the motive to establish a strong footprint in Indian football by producing quality professional players. The main objective of this project has been to supply professional quality players to the East Bengal senior team & Indian national team.

The East Bengal Academy was founded in the early part of the 21st century and had a major success initially as the U-19 East Bengal team won the first two U-19 National Football leagues held in 2001-02 and 2002-03 and then the club's Under-15 team qualified for the Manchester United Premier Cup after being champions of India defeating Mahindra United 1–0 in the final, and becoming South–East Asian regional runners up in 2007. The Junior team faced the youth teams of Manchester United, A.S. Roma and Shandong Luneng and FK Austria Wien in the final round held in Manchester, however, they lost all the games in the group stages. In the 17–20th place play-off semi-finals, the team defeated Bukit Jalil of Malaysia by 3-1, but lost to Central United of New Zealand in the 17th place play-offs by 5-3 via tiebreakers, after the game ended goalless. The U-15 team finished 18th among the 20 teams who had reached the world final stage and is to date the best finish by any Indian club in the Nike Premier Cup. The East Bengal U-19 team was the primary youth team before the Elite League started in 2010. Players like Israil Gurung, Saikat Saha Roy etc. were part of the East Bengal youth setup in the mid 2000s. In 2006, former East Bengal legend and National League winning coach Monoranjan Bhattacharya was appointed as the head coach of the East Bengal U-19 team.

The East Bengal Academy started with new endeavours in 2016 as they brought in Ranjan Chowdhury as head of the project with an aim to produce Indian talents and build up the supply line for the main team of East Bengal. The team finished runners-up in the 2016–17 I-League U18, losing 2-1 to AIFF Elite Academy in the final. The team also reached the semi-final in 2017–18. The team was disbanded after the 2019–20 Indian Elite League was called off due to COVID-19 pandemic in India. In 2022, after the new investors  Emami Group joined the club, the youth teams have been revived

Reserve team
East Bengal officially did not have a reserve team prior to 2020. However, the club formed a reserve team composed of academy players and few senior team members to participate in minor tournaments like Bordoloi Trophy, Darjeeling Gold Cup etc. In 2018, the East Bengal Reserves team, coached by Ranjan Chowdhury, won the Darjeeling Gold Cup defeating another Kolkata giant Mohammedan Sporting in the final.

The reserve team was formed in 2020 and intended to play in the I-League 2, along with the Calcutta Football League from the 2020–21 season. However, due to the COVID-19 pandemic in India, the team was scrapped and after new investors Emami group tied up with the club, the reserve team was once again launched in 2022. Former Kerala football team coach Bino George was appointed as the head coach of the reserve team. The club also recruited former captain Sangram Mukherjee as the goalkeeper coach for the team. The club also bolstered the squad by making some top signings from the Santosh Trophy teams, including five players from Kerala, the champions of the 2021–22 edition. The reserve participated in the 2022 Calcutta Premier Division and finished fourth in the Super Six. The reserve team would also participate in the 2022–23 I-League 2 along with the reserve teams of other Indian Super League sides – Bengaluru FC, Chennaiyin FC , FC Goa, Hyderabad FC and Mumbai City FC. The club also roped in AFC A license holder Archisman Biswas as the assistant coach for the reserve side ahead of the I-League 2 campaign.

2022–23

Reserve squad

Coaching staff

Under-21
East Bengal participate in the Reliance Foundation Development League from the 2023. Reserve team head coach Bino George has been in charge of the developmental league squad. East Bengal fielded a squad composed of players from its senior team, reserves, youth teams and its academy in Rajganj. On 14 March, in the first RFDL game, East Bengal defeated United SC to start their campaign.

Squad
<onlyinclude>

Under-17
The under-17 team participates in the U17 Youth Cup. The team is coached by former East Bengal captain Tarun Dey.

The National Football League U-19 was launched in 2001 and the East Bengal U-19 team won the inaugural edition defeating India sub-juniors 3–2 in the final. The U-19 team defended the title the following year as they defeated JCT Football Academy 1–0 in the final. The team also finished runners-up in the 2003–04 edition as they lost to their rivals Mohun Bagan U-19 3–1 in the penalty shoot-out after the final ended 0–0 in regulation time. After the tournament was restarted as the I-League U19 in 2008 and later renamed to Elite League, the East Bengal team became runners-up four times, failing to win to the title. In 2022, the tournament was redesigned as a U-17 category, after not being held for two seasons due to the COVID-19 pandemic.

Squad
<onlyinclude>
The East Bengal Under-17 squad for 2022-23 season

Coaching Staff 
As of 19 December 2022

Performance record

Under-15
The under-15 team participates in the Elite Youth League. The team is coached by Chandan Kumar Ray.

Squad 
The East Bengal Academy Under-15 squad for 2019–20 season

Performance record

Matches at the 2007 Nike Premier Cup

Under-13
The under-13 team participates in the Elite Youth League. The team is coached by former India International and East Bengal FC legend Tarun Dey.

Squad
The SC East Bengal Academy Under-13 squad for 2019-20 season

Performance record

Noted graduates

Those who made it at the club

East Bengal's youth system has been successful over the last few years; many players who have come through it have gone on to feature in the first-team. The following players have gone on to play over ten competitive matches for the first team.

Players who have represented the National team are in Bold.

2000s
  Anupam Sarkar
  Kingshuk Debnath
  Priyant Singh
  Saikat Saha Roy
  Gouranga Biswas
  Budhiram Tudu
  Gurpreet Singh Sandhu

2010s
  Abhinas Ruidas
  Seiminlen Doungel
  Jiten Murmu
  Mehtab Singh
  Prakash Sarkar 
  Manoj Mohammed
  Bidyashagar Singh
  PC Rohlupuia

2020s

  Ankit Mukherjee
  Hira Mondal

Those who made it elsewhere 
East Bengal FC academy graduates who didn't make it at the club but made it somewhere else and even went on to play for the national team:

Players who have represented the National team are in Bold.

2000s
  Arup Debnath
  Israil Gurung

2010s
  Milan Singh
  Pankaj Moula
  Ankit Mukherjee
  Rafique Ali Sardar

2020s
  Telem Suranjit Singh
  Salam Johnson Singh
  Bikash Singh Sagolshem

Honours

Reserves
 Darjeeling Gold Cup (1): 2018
 Madhyamgram MLA Cup (1): 2023

Academy U18
IFA Shield (1): 2018

National Football League U-19 (2): 2001, 2002–03

AIFF Youth Leagues (4): 2010, 2011, 2014, 2016-17

Zee Bangla Football League (U-19) (1): 2019()

SRMB Cup (U-18) (1): 2019

All Bengal Knockout Tournament (U-19) (1): 2019

Academy U-15
Manchester United Premier Cup India: 2007

References

External links
 Official website

East Bengal Club
Indian reserve football teams
Football academies in India
Youth League U18
I-League 2nd Division clubs